International trips made by presidents of the United States have become a valuable part of the United States' interactions with foreign nations since such trips were first made in the early 20th century. Traveling abroad is one of the many duties of the president of the United States, leading the nation's diplomatic efforts through state visits, private meetings with foreign leaders or attending international summits. These are complicated undertakings that require months of planning along with a great deal of coordination and communication.

In the 19th century, American social convention made international travel by the incumbent president taboo, though foreign travel by former presidents was acceptable. The most widely publicized trip of this nature was the 1877–79 world tour of Ulysses S. Grant. Domestic travel was regarded as a welcome opportunity for presidents to talk with the people who had elected them, but foreign travel was seen in an altogether different light. The general public did not want their president mingling with royalty, visiting grand palaces, or exchanging bows with kings and queens. This taboo was broken in the early 20th century, as policy makers at the federal level began to reevaluate the nation's role in international affairs.

The first international presidential trip, Theodore Roosevelt's 1906 visit to Panama, signaled a new era in how presidents conducted diplomatic relations with other countries. Roosevelt's four immediate successors made at least one international trip while in office, cementing the acceptability of presidential global travel.

New transportation technologies also played a role in the changing patterns of presidential travel as well. Early in the 20th century, trips were made by steamship. When Woodrow Wilson traveled to Europe aboard the George Washington in 1918–19, the voyage took nine days. Forty years later, Dwight Eisenhower made the same trip by jet in nine hours. Jet aircraft enabled American presidents to travel the globe in ways that would have been impractical if not inconceivable before. While Eisenhower was the first president to travel by jet (and the first to travel via helicopter as well), the first airplane trips by a sitting president were those of Franklin D. Roosevelt. He made multiple long-distance trips abroad by plane, each one an offshoot of Allied diplomatic interactions during World War II. Lyndon B. Johnson, who flew 523,000 miles aboard Air Force One while in office, made the first round-the-world presidential trip in December 1967.

The frequency and travel distance of presidential international travel has increased dramatically since George H. W. Bush became president in 1989. In 1990 the military version of the Boeing 747, the VC-25, was introduced for the use of the president. The plane is accompanied by a heavy lift aircraft that carries the helicopters and the limousines. Presidents Bill Clinton (1993–2001) and George W. Bush (2001–2009) visited 72 and 73 countries respectively during their terms of office. All totaled, they went to 91 countries with a combined population of 85% of the world total. President Barack Obama (2009–2017) visited 58 countries. A round the world trip was first done by Johnson and subsequently has been done by presidents Nixon and Bush. Trips to Europe and Asia are becoming almost routine in the 21st century.

Early 20th century trips
With the completion of the Panama Canal in 1914, the American Panama Canal Zone became a major staging area for the U.S. military and the U.S. became the dominant military power in Central America. When Theodore Roosevelt traveled to Panama in November 1906 to inspect progress on the canal, he became the first U.S. president to leave the country while in office. Subsequently, both William Howard Taft (in 1909) and Warren G. Harding (in 1920) visited Panama while each was the president-elect.

Taft and Harding each made one international trip while president. Taft and Mexican president Porfirio Díaz exchanged visits across the Mexico–United States border, at El Paso, Texas, and Ciudad Juárez, Mexico, in October 1909. While filled with much symbolism, the meetings did pave the way for the start of construction on the Elephant Butte Dam project in 1911, even as Mexico fell into revolution. Harding made an official visit to Vancouver, British Columbia on July 27, 1923 (six days prior to his death). Greeted dock-side by the premier of British Columbia and the mayor of Vancouver, he was given a parade through the city to Stanley Park, where he spoke to an audience estimated at over 40,000.

Woodrow Wilson made two international trips while in office. When he sailed for France in December 1918 for the Paris Peace Conference, he became the first sitting president to travel to Europe. He spent nearly seven months in Europe, interrupted by a brief nine-day return to the U.S. in late February 1919. Wilson was awarded the 1919 Nobel Peace Prize for his peacemaking efforts. While in Rome, he met with Pope Benedict XV; this was the first meeting between an incumbent American president and a reigning pope.

Calvin Coolidge traveled to Havana, Cuba in January 1928, where he addressed the Sixth International Conference of American States. There, he extended an olive branch to Latin American leaders embittered over America's interventionist policies in Central America and the Caribbean. It was the only time in his life that he traveled outside the contiguous United States.

The most recent president not to make any international trips during his time in office was Herbert Hoover (1929–33). He did, however, undertake an extensive ten-week tour of Latin America during the time he was president-elect. He delivered 25 speeches in 10 countries, almost all of which stressed his plans to reduce American political and military interference in Latin American affairs. In sum, he pledged that the United States would act as a "good neighbor."

Franklin D. Roosevelt

Franklin D. Roosevelt made 20 international trips during his presidency. His early travels were by ship, frequently for fishing vacations to the Bahama Banks, Canadian Maritimes or Newfoundland Island. In 1943 he became the first incumbent president to fly by airplane across the Atlantic Ocean during his secret mission to Casablanca. As a result of this trip, he also became the first president to visit North Africa while in office.

Harry S. Truman

Harry S. Truman made five international trips during his presidency. Three months after ascending to the presidency, Truman made his only trans-Atlantic trip as president to participate in talks concerning how to administer the defeated Nazi Germany, which had agreed to unconditional surrender nine weeks earlier (V-E Day). He also visited neighboring Bermuda, Canada and Mexico, plus Brazil in South America. Truman only left the continental United States on two other occasions (to Puerto Rico, the Virgin Islands, Guantanamo Bay Naval Base, Cuba, February  1948; and to Wake Island, October  1950) during his nearly eight years in office.

Dwight D. Eisenhower

Dwight D. Eisenhower made 16 international trips during his presidency. He also traveled abroad once while president-elect, visiting South Korea in December 1952, fulfilling a campaign pledge to investigate what might get stalled Korean War peace talks moving forward. By the time he left office in January 1961, Eisenhower had visited 26 countries.

Columbine II, one of four propeller-driven aircraft introduced to presidential service during Eisenhower's first term in office, was the first plane to bear the call sign Air Force One. This designation for the U.S. Air Force aircraft carrying the incumbent president was established after an incident in 1953, when Eastern Air Lines 8610, a commercial flight, crossed paths with Air Force 8610, which was carrying President Eisenhower. Initially used informally, the designation became official in 1962.

In 1959, the Air Force added the first of three specially built Boeing 707-120 jet aircraft—VC-137s, designated SAM (Special Air Missions) 970, 971 and 972—into the fleet. The high-speed jet technology built into these aircraft enabled presidents from Eisenhower through Nixon to travel long distances more quickly for face-to-face meetings with world leaders. That year he journeyed to Europe, Southeast Asia, South America, Middle East, and Southern Asia. On his "Flight to Peace" goodwill tour in December 1959, the president visited 11 nations, flying  in 19 days aboard the VC-137 SAM970.

John F. Kennedy

John F. Kennedy made eight international trips during his presidency. Two of these were to Europe, and the other six were to various nations in the Western Hemisphere. His second trip to Europe included the famous speech Ich bin ein Berliner at the Berlin Wall, the visit of the first Catholic president to Vatican City, plus the visit to Kennedy's ancestral home in Ireland. First Lady Jacqueline Kennedy traveled with him on his 1961 visit to France and received such a popular reaction there that the president quipped "I am the man who accompanied Jacqueline Kennedy to Paris – and I have enjoyed it!"

Lyndon B. Johnson

Lyndon B. Johnson made 11 international trips during his presidency. He flew 523,000 miles aboard Air Force One while in office. Eschewing Europe in favor of Southeast Asia and Latin America. One of the most unusual international trips in presidential history occurred before Christmas in 1967. The president began the trip by going to the memorial service for Australian Prime Minister Harold Holt, who had disappeared in a swimming accident and was presumed drowned. The White House did not reveal in advance to the press that the president would make the first round-the-world presidential trip. The trip was 26,959 miles completed in 112.5 hours (4.7 days). The trip crossed the equator twice, stopped in Travis Air Force Base, California, then Honolulu, Pago Pago, Canberra, Melbourne, Vietnam, Karachi and Rome.

Richard Nixon

Richard M. Nixon made 15 international trips during his presidency. He made the unusual move of going on a week-long trip to Europe only five weeks after his inauguration. Nixon's 1972 visit to China was an important strategic and diplomatic overture that marked the culmination of the Nixon administration's resumption of cordial relations between the U.S. and China. He also made groundbreaking trips to various Communist-ruled nations as well, including: Romania (1969), Yugoslavia (1970), Poland (1972), and the Soviet Union (1972 and 1974). In 1972 Nixon received delivery of the second custom outfitted jet to be used as Air Force One, VC-137C SAM 27000.

Gerald Ford

Gerald Ford made seven international trips during his presidency. Ford made the first visit of a sitting president to Japan, and followed it with a trip to the Republic of Korea and the Soviet Union (to attend the Vladivostok Summit).

Jimmy Carter

Jimmy Carter made 12 international trips to 25 countries during his presidency. Carter was the first president to make a state visit to Sub-Saharan Africa when he went to Nigeria in 1978. His travel included five trips to Europe and three trips to Asia. He also made several trips to the Middle East to broker peace negotiations. He was awarded the 2002 Nobel Peace Prize for his peacemaking efforts. In 1978 he travelled to Panama City to sign a protocol confirming exchange of documents ratifying the Panama Canal treaties.

Ronald Reagan

Ronald Reagan made 25 international trips to 26 countries during his presidency. He made seven trips to continental Europe, three to Asia and one to South America. He is perhaps best remembered for his speeches at the 40th anniversary of the Normandy landings, for his impassioned speech at the Berlin Wall, his summit meetings with Mikhail Gorbachev, and riding horses with the Queen at Windsor Park.

Reagan's presidency would be transitional in international travel. During his term in office, he ordered the two special mission Boeing VC-25 that would become the new presidential transport to replace the aging Boeing 707s. Heavy lift aircraft could bring security, limousines, and helicopters. After that time, the president had access to inflight bedrooms and showers, boardrooms, and communication equipment and with refueling virtually unlimited range. Summit meetings would proliferate, and international travel would become more of a constant expectation of the presidency.

George H. W. Bush

George H. W. Bush made 26 international trips to 58 countries during his presidency. He initiated the frequent international travel pace that is the hallmark of the post–Cold War presidency. He went to Europe eleven times, Asia twice, and South America once, along with a number of shorter trips during his four years in office.

Bill Clinton

Bill Clinton made 54 trips to 72 countries (in addition to visiting the West Bank and Gaza) during his presidency. He made 24 trips to continental Europe, seventeen to Asia, two to Africa and to Australia. His others were to nations in the Americas.

George W. Bush

George W. Bush made 49 trips to 73 countries (in addition to visiting the West Bank) during his presidency. During the course of his first year in office alone, he took seven trips to seventeen countries. He visited six continents: Africa, Asia, Australia, Europe, North America, and South America. On one of his two trips to Sub-Saharan Africa, he visited three of the poorest countries in the world at the time: Liberia, Rwanda, and Benin. He also made a secret trip to Iraq on Thanksgiving Day 2003 to dine with the troops. His father had made a similar visit to the U.S. troops in Saudi Arabia in 1990. On November 15–20, 2006, Bush made the third round the world presidential flight (after Johnson and Nixon) when he went to Russia, Singapore, Vietnam, and Indonesia.

Barack Obama

Barack Obama made 52 trips to 58 countries (in addition to visiting the West Bank) during his presidency. He set the record as the most-traveled president for any first year in office: he took the most trips, visited the most countries, and spent the most days abroad. Obama made ten trips to 21 countries (four countries were visited twice) and was out of the U.S. a total of 37 days. The one geopolitical region that he never visited was Central Asia; this region has never been visited by a sitting U.S. president.

In December 2010, he made an unannounced trip to Afghanistan, where he visited with U.S. troops. The surprise trip came as the U.S. and NATO withdraw most of their forces from that country ahead of a year-end deadline. In November 2012 he visited Myanmar, where he bolstered the reforms undertaken by that nation's military-backed government. In March 2016, he made a historic trip to Cuba to underscore the thaw in Cuba–United States relations following a 54-year rift.

Donald Trump

Donald Trump made 19 international trips to 24 countries (in addition to visiting the West Bank) during his presidency. His 2018 Singapore Summit meeting with North Korean leader Kim Jong-un was the first-ever meeting between an incumbent U.S. president and a leader of North Korea. One year later, in June 2019, Trump also became the first American president to cross over the Korean Demilitarized Zone and enter North Korea while in office. In December 2018, he made an unannounced Christmas trip to Iraq, where he visited with U.S. troops. Nearly a year later, in November 2019, he made an unannounced Thanksgiving trip to Afghanistan, where he visited with U.S. troops.

Joe Biden

Joe Biden has made 10 international trips to 17 countries (in addition to visiting the West Bank) since his presidency began on January 20, 2021. He made six trips abroad in 2022, including a September visit to the  United Kingdom for the state funeral of Queen Elizabeth II. On February 20, 2023, he made an unannounced trip to Ukraine, where he met with President Volodymyr Zelenskyy ahead of the first anniversary of the  Russian invasion of Ukraine.

Table of destinations
Altogether, 20 U.S. presidents have traveled to at least one foreign country or dependent territory while in office.

Notes

See also
 Foreign policy of the United States
 Foreign relations of the United States
 International relations
 List of diplomatic visits to the United States
 List of international trips made by secretaries of state of the United States
 List of meetings between the pope and the president of the United States

References

External links

 Travels Abroad of the President, Office of the Historian, Bureau of Public Affairs, United States Department of State
 Going Global: Assessing Presidential Foreign Travel, Amnon Cavari and Micah Ables. Interdisciplinary Center Herzliya
 International Presidential Travel Cost Analyses Archive, National Taxpayers Union Foundation

Lists of United States presidential visits
United States presidential visits
Foreign relations of the United States
United States presidential history